The Joseph Cook House, at 63 W. 2nd, South, in Paris, Idaho, was built in 1906.  It was listed on the National Register of Historic Places in 1982.

It is a one-and-a-half-story buff brick house.

The listing included a contributing structure, a historic iron fence separating the property from the street. The fence's "running sections are in a hoop-and-arrow pattern; the
gateposts terminate in miniature groin vaults and finials. The legend of Stewart Iron Works, Cincinnati, Ohio, is cast into the metal."

References

National Register of Historic Places in Bear Lake County, Idaho
Queen Anne architecture in Idaho
Neoclassical architecture in Idaho
Houses completed in 1906
1906 establishments in Idaho